Albert John Shook (March 12, 1899 – January 1, 1984) was an American football guard who played one season with the Columbus Panhandles of the American Professional Football Association.

References

External links
Just Sports Stats

1899 births
1984 deaths
Players of American football from Ohio
American football guards
Columbus Panhandles players
People from Circleville, Ohio